Jurij Wertatsch  was a politician of the mid 17th century in Slovenia, when the country was under the Holy Roman Empire. He became mayor of Ljubljana in 1650. He was succeeded by Janez Steringer in 1657.

References

Mayors of places in the Holy Roman Empire
Mayors of Ljubljana
Year of birth missing
Year of death missing
17th-century Slovenian politicians